is a Japanese actress, singer and model. In 2017 she was the vocalist and dancer in Mondo Grosso's videos for "Labyrinth", which has garnered over 35 million views on YouTube as of February 2023, and "In this World".

Career
She began her music career in 1997 as a teenage 'idol singer' in the J-pop groups Folder and Folder 5. She made her acting debut in the same year, starring as Shiori Uchiura / Little Girl in the kaiju film Rebirth of Mothra II. Her first television appearance came in 2005, when she played Elly in Ultraman Max. Her film career recommenced as Sayu Yagami in 2006's manga-adaptation thriller film Death Note, and in 2008 she starred as Yōko Ozawa in Love Exposure, a comedy-dramaart film directed by Sion Sono. Her performance in Love Exposure brought her critical attention and won her and her team several awards.

Since then Mitsushima has had starring roles in numerous films and television dramas including 2010's Sawako Decides, written and directed by Yuya Ishii. Mitsushima and Ishii married in 2010 and divorced in 2016.

Mitsushima has made occasional vocal contributions to Japanese pop singles. She featured as a vocalist in the fictional band SRM on Stephanie's "Pride ~A Part of Me~", the title song for the 2009 Japanese drama film Pride. In 2017, she provided lead vocals for fictional band Doughnuts Hole's "Otona no Okite", the theme song for television drama Quartet, in which she starred as Suzume Sebuki. In the same year, she appeared as a featured vocalist in Mondo Grosso's song "Labyrinth" and starred as a dancer in the music video (over 35million views on YouTube).

Filmography

Film

Rebirth of Mothra II (1997) as Shiori Uranai / Little girl
Death Note (2006) as Sayu Yagami
Death Note 2: The Last Name (2006) as Sayu Yagami
Exte: Hair Extensions (2007) as Yuriko Shiina
Shaolin Girl (2008) as Hikari Takahashi
Drop in Ghost (2008)
Love Exposure (2008) as Yōko
Pride (2009) as Moe Midorikawa
Be Sure to Share (2009) as Schoolgirl
The Wonderful World of Captain Kuhio (2009) as Haru Yasuoka
Kakera: A Piece of Our Life (2009) as Haru
Rinco's Restaurant (2009)
Sawako Decides (2010) as Sawako
Villain (2010)
Hara-Kiri: Death of a Samurai (2011) as Miho
Tormented (2011) as Kiriko
Smuggler (2011) as Tanuma Chiharu
Moteki (2011)
A Chorus of Angels (2012) as Manami
The End of Summer (2013) as Tomoko
Hello! Junichi (2014)
Kakekomi (2015) as Ogin
One Piece Film: Gold (2016) as Carina (voice)
Traces of Sin (2017) as Mitsuko
Umibe no Sei to Shi (2017) as Miho Shimao
Mary and the Witch's Flower (2017) as The Red-Haired Witch (voice)
The Bucket List (2019)
Riverside Mukolitta (2022)
I Am Makimoto (2022) as Tōko Tsumori
Tang and Me (2022) as Emi

Television

Ultraman Max (2005–2006) as Elly
Dandori Musume (2006) as Ulala
Beni no monshō (2006) as Ayako (2006)
Burokkorii (2007)
Kaette kita jikō keisatsu (2007) as Mitsuyo
Kamen Rider Den-O (2007) as Yuka Sawada
Kekkon sagishi (2007)
Shakin Kanojo (2008)
Hitomi (2008) as Junko
MAKE THE LAST WISH (2008)
Uramiya honpo reboot (2009)
IRIS (2009) /dubbed for Kim So-yeon/
Bloody Monday (manga) (2010) as Risa Kurano / Lisa
Tsuki no Koibito ~Moon Lovers~ (2010) as Anzai Rina
Moteki (2010) as Nakashiba Itsuka
Dazai Osamu tanpen shōsetsu shū 3 (2010)
Sayonara Bokutachi no Youchien (2011, TV Movie) as Yoshiki Mari
Ohisama (2011)
Soredemo, Ikite yuku (2011) as Futaba
Kaitakushatachi (2012)
Woman (2013) as Koharu
Wakamono Tachi (2014) as Hikari
Gomen ne Seishun! (2014) as Lisa
Dokonjō Gaeru (2015) as Pyonkichi (voice)
Totto TV (2016) as Tetsuko Kuroyanagi
Kidnap Tour (2016)
Quartet (2017) as Suzume
Kangoku no Ohimesama (2017) as Futaba Wakai
Mirai e no 10 Count (2022) as Aoi Orihara
First Love (2022) as Yae Noguchi

Awards
She has won the following awards for her performances:

Fant-Asia Film Festival
2009: Jury Prize: Best Female Performance – Love Exposure

Hochi Film Awards
2009: Best New Talent – Love Exposure, Pride, The Wonderful World of Captain Kuhio

International Drama Festival in Tokyo
2011: Best Supporting Actress – Moteki, Sayonara Bokutachi no Youchien
2014: Best Actress – Woman

Kinema Junpo Awards
2010: Best Supporting Actress – Love Exposure, Pride, The Wonderful World of Captain Kuhio

Mainichi Film Concours
2010: Sponichi Grand Prize: New Talent Award (shared with co-star Takahiro Nishijima) – Love Exposure

Yokohama Film Festival
2010: Best New Talent – Love Exposure, Pride, The Wonderful World of Captain Kuhio
2011: Best Actress – Love Vibes, Sawako Decides

Japanese Film Critics Awards
2016: Best Supporting Actress – Kakekomi

References

External links

1985 births
Living people
People from Kagoshima
Japanese actresses
Japanese gravure models
Japanese women pop singers
21st-century Japanese women singers
21st-century Japanese singers
Japanese people of French descent